Maple butter, also known as maple cream or maple spread, is a confection made from maple syrup, by heating the syrup to approximately , cooling it to around , and beating it until it reaches a smooth consistency. It is usually made from Grade A Light Amber syrup (sometimes known as Fancy), and is a light tan color.

The consistency of maple butter is light and spreadable, very similar to the consistency of peanut butter. Its name comes from the fact that it is "buttery" or "creamy" smooth, not because it contains any dairy product (it is dairy-free). It is sometimes used as a spread instead of butter, or as a frosting. Cinnamon is sometimes added to create "maple cinnamon butter".

Maple butter can also refer to blending maple syrup and butter, a typical recipe made of two parts butter to one part syrup.

See also
 List of foods made from maple
 List of spreads

References

Further reading
 Lyon, Amy, and Lynne Andreen. In a Vermont Kitchen. HP Books: 1999. . pp. 68–69.
 Strickland, Ron. Vermonters: Oral Histories from Down Country to the Northeast Kingdom. New England Press: 1986. .

Butter
Canadian cuisine
Cuisine of Quebec
Vermont cuisine
Food_paste
Maritime culture